The 1972 European Karate Championships, the 7th edition of the European Karate Championships, was held in Brussels, Belgium from May 2 to 4, 1972.

Competition

Team

References

1972
International sports competitions hosted by Belgium
European Karate Championships
European championships in 1972
Sports competitions in Brussels
1970s in Brussels
Karate competitions in Belgium
May 1972 sports events in Europe